Adamasingba Stadium ( also called Lekan Salami stadium) is a multi-use stadium in Ibadan, Nigeria.  It is currently used mostly for football matches and is the home stadium of Shooting Stars FC and other local teams located in Ibadan.  The stadium has a capacity of 10,000 people.

Shooting Stars FC are an extremely successful team and have many fans. They won the championship in 1993 and soon after went to the bottom of the ladder.

The potential of the sporting complex has however not been optimally utilised due to rot and decay making most facilities moribund as a result of what many believes is a lack of maintenance culture. Over the years, many of the structures have been overtaken by bushes and taken over by reptiles.

History
Adamasingba complex was built on 130,000 square meters of land, formerly occupied by Ibadan race course. It was open on 28 May 1988. Development plans for the complex began in 1976 during the administration of David Jemibewon. The race course space had gone unused and had been occupied by illegal structures and activities, to reclaim the land, the military government of Jemibewon decided to build a recreational and sports complex. While the initial design was for a sports and recreational complex, provision of additional facilities for shops was later added. At inception, the complex included a football field, tennis courts, squash court and indoor sports hall. Since it was opened, the facilities have been poorly maintained.

The stadium was named Lekan Salami Stadium in 1998 in honour of Chief Lekan Salami by the Oyo State Military Governor Hammed Usman.

In 2021, the stadium was renovated with new cutting edge technologies with fifa recommended natural grass.

References

Football venues in Nigeria
Buildings and structures in Ibadan
Sport in Ibadan